Timeless Films (formerly known as Odyssey Entertainment) is a London-based film finance, sales, and distribution company, founded in 2001 by Louise Goodsill and Ralph Kamp, which ceased trading in August 2009, and it was officially renamed as Timeless Films.

Timeless Films was involved in the financing of the following feature films:
Scrooge: A Christmas Carol (2022)
Koati (2021)
Monster Family 2 (2021)
Extinct (2021)
Dragon Rider (2020)
Pets United (2020)
Monster Family (2017)
Rock Dog (2016)
Postman Pat: The Movie (2014)
Justin and the Knights of Valour (2013)
The Wedding Video (2012)
Animals United (2010)
An Education (2009)
 Is Anybody There? (2008)
 Easy Virtue (2008)
 A Bunch of Amateurs (2008)
 Space Chimps (2008)
 The Deaths of Ian Stone (2007)
 August Rush (2007)
 Then She Found Me (2007)
 Happily N'Ever After (2006)
 Fade to Black (2006)
 Renaissance (2006)
 Lassie (2005)
 Boy Eats Girl (2005)
 Valiant (2005)
 The Phantom of the Opera (2004)
 The Libertine (2004)
 Deathwatch (2002)

References

Film production companies of the United Kingdom
British film studios